Difference algebra is a branch of mathematics concerned with the study of difference (or functional) equations from the algebraic point of view. Difference algebra is analogous to differential algebra but concerned with difference equations rather than differential equations. As an independent subject it was initiated by Joseph Ritt and his student Richard Cohn.

Difference rings, difference fields and difference algebras 

A difference ring is a commutative ring  together with a ring endomorphism . Often it is assumed that  is injective. When  is a field one speaks of a difference field. The role of difference rings in difference algebra is similar to the role of commutative rings in commutative algebra and algebraic geometry. A difference algebra over a difference field  is a difference ring  with a -algebra structure such that  is a morphism of difference rings, i.e.  extends . A difference algebra that is a field is called a difference field extension.

Algebraic difference equations 

Difference varieties 

This definition has to be made more precise by specifying where one is looking for the solutions.

This result can be seen as a difference analog of Hilbert's basis theorem.

Applications 

Difference algebra is related to many other mathematical areas, such as discrete dynamical systems, combinatorics, number theory, or model theory. While some real life problems, such as population dynamics, can be modeled by algebraic difference equations, difference algebra also has applications in pure mathematics. For example, there is a proof of the Manin–Mumford conjecture using methods of difference algebra. The model theory of difference fields has been studied.

See also 
 Finite difference
 Recurrence relation
 Functional equation
 Differential algebra

Notes

References

Alexander Levin (2008), Difference algebra, Springer, 
Richard M. Cohn (1979), Difference algebra, R.E. Krieger Pub. Co.,

External links

 The home page of Zoé Chatzidakis has several online surveys discussing (the model theory of) difference fields.

Algebras